Revertuncaria is a genus of moths belonging to the family Tortricidae.

Species
Revertuncaria spathula Razowski, 1986

See also
List of Tortricidae genera

References

 , 2011: Diagnoses and remarks on genera of Tortricidae, 2: Cochylini (Lepidoptera: Tortricidae). SHILAP Revista de Lepidopterología 39 (156): 397–414.

External links
Tortricid.net

Cochylini
Tortricidae genera